Power Rangers is a comic book franchise published by Boom! Studios, based on the television series of the same name. Initially licensed through Saban Brands in 2015, the rights moved to Hasbro in 2018.

Publication history 
In June 2015, Boom! Studios and Saban Brands announced a new comic book series based on Mighty Morphin Power Rangers. The initial creative staff featured Kyle Higgins as the writer, Steve Orlando and Mairghread Scott as co-writers, with Hendry Prasetya and Daniel Bayliss as the artists.

In February 2016, Boom! announced a spin-off limited series entitled Mighty Morphin Power Rangers: Pink by Brenden Fletcher, Kelly Thompson, and Daniele Di Nicuolo.

In April 2017, Boom! announced a prequel series titled Saban's Go Go Power Rangers by Ryan Parrott and Dan Mora.

In December 2017, Boom Studios announced "Shattered Grid", a crossover storyline between Mighty Morphin Power Rangers and Saban's Go Go Power Rangers, which celebrated the 25th anniversary of Power Rangers.

In July 2018, Hasbro became the new owner of the Power Rangers franchise.

In March 2019, Boom! announced "Necessary Evil", the second crossover event between Mighty Morphin Power Rangers and Saban's Go Go Power Rangers, written by Ryan Parrott and Sina Grace. Following the impact of the COVID-19 pandemic over the comic book industry, the event concluded in June 2020, with Saban's Go Go Power Rangers ending after 32 issues.

The mainline Mighty Morphin Power Rangers series concluded in October 2020 after 55 issues, and in November, it is continued by two new separate series (titled as Mighty Morphin and Power Rangers) that launched a new storyline titled "Unlimited Power".

In August 2021, "The Eltarian War" was announced as the conclusion of the "Unlimited Power" event, along with the limited series Power Rangers Universe. Mat Groom became the writer of Mighty Morphin following this crossover.

In April 2022, it was announced that both Mighty Morphin and Power Rangers series would end in August 2022 as part of a special crossover event titled "Charge to 100!" The event would then conclude in September 2022 with the relaunched Mighty Morphin Power Rangers #100, as well as being the final issue written by Ryan Parrott. In July 2022, it was announced that Melissa Flores would serve as the new writer with art by Simona Di Gianfelce.

List of works

Setting

Collected editions

Reception 
Mighty Morphin Power Rangers has gained mostly positive reviews, with the #1 issue selling approximately 100,000 copies. The #1 issues of Mighty Morphin Power Rangers: Pink and Saban's Go Go Power Rangers have also received positive reviews.

See also 
 Power Rangers (comics)
 List of comics based on Hasbro properties

References 

Comics based on television series
2016 comics debuts
Boom! Studios titles
Comics set on fictional planets
Power Rangers
Comic book reboots
Comic books suspended due to the COVID-19 pandemic